Rhinestone is a 1984 American musical comedy film directed by Bob Clark from a screenplay by Sylvester Stallone and Phil Alden Robinson and starring Stallone, Dolly Parton, Richard Farnsworth and Ron Leibman. It is based on the 1975 hit song "Rhinestone Cowboy" written by Larry Weiss. Although a critical and financial failure, the film spawned two top 10 country hits for Parton.

Plot
Jake Farris, a down home country singer stuck in a long-term contract performing at "The Rhinestone", a sleazy urban cowboy nightclub in New York City, boasts to the club's manager, Freddie, that she can make anybody into a country sensation, insisting that she can turn any normal guy into a country singer in just two weeks. Freddie accepts Jake's bet, putting up the remainder of Jake's contract (if she wins the bet, the contract becomes void; if she loses, another five years will be added). He then ups the ante: if Jake loses, she must also sleep with him.

The problem is that Freddie can select the man, and he selects an obnoxious New York City cabbie named Nick Martinelli. Nick not only has no musical talent whatsoever, he claims to hate country music "worse than liver". Realizing she is stuck with Nick, she takes him back to her home in Tennessee to teach him how to walk, talk and behave like a real country star. While there, he has to put up with Jake's constant nagging and berating him about his behavior, the culture-shock of not knowing anything about the South, and Jake's ex-fiancée Barnett Kale who befriends Nick, then turns on him when he realizes that he and Jake have developed feelings for one another.

It all leads to Nick performing a song at The Rhinestone where the crowd is a crazed group of hecklers and are "out for blood." After Nick's first attempt to sing bombs, he turns to the band and says, "Okay guys, let's pick up the beat" and the band begins playing the song in a more Rock n' Roll version and he wins the crowd over. In the end, Jake gets her contract back and she and Nick begin to sing another song with the implication that they will continue their budding relationship together.

Cast

 Sylvester Stallone as Nick Martinelli
 Dolly Parton as Jake Farris
 Richard Farnsworth as Noah Farris 
 Ron Leibman as Freddie Ugo 
 Tim Thomerson as Barnett Kale
 Steve Peck (credited as Stephen Apostle Pec) as Nick's father 
 Penny Santon as Nick's mother
 Russell Buchanan as Elgart
 Ritch Brinkley as Luke
 Jerry Potter as Walt
 Jesse Welles as Billie Joe
 Phil Rubenstein as Maurie
 Tony Munafo as Tony
 Don Hanmer as Sid
 Speck Rhodes as Mr. Polk
 Guy Fitch as Wino
 Cindy Perlman as Esther Jean

Production

Development and writing
Stallone reportedly turned down Romancing the Stone and Beverly Hills Cop (1984) to make Rhinestone. He was paid $5 million and a percentage of the gross.

Original screenwriter Phil Alden Robinson was so offended by Stallone's reworking of his original screenplay that he briefly considered having his name removed from the film's credits. He was later convinced that having his name on a film of this "caliber" would look good on his resume.

In 2006 Stallone said:
The most fun I ever had on a movie was with Dolly Parton on RHINESTONE. I must tell everyone right now that originally the director was supposed to be Mike Nichols, that was the intention and it was supposed to be shot in New York, down and dirty with Dolly and I with gutsy mannerisms performed like two antagonists brought together by fate. I wanted the music at that time to be written by people who would give it sort of a bizarre edge. Believe it or not, I contacted Whitesnake's management and they were ready to write some very interesting songs alongside Dolly's. But, I was asked to come down to Fox and out steps the director, Bob Clark. Bob is a nice guy, but the film went in a direction that literally shattered my internal corn meter into smithereens. I would have done many things differently. I certainly would've steered clear of comedy unless it was dark, Belgian chocolate dark. Silly comedy didn't work for me. I mean, would anybody pay to see John Wayne in a whimsical farce? Not likely. I would stay more true to who I am and what the audience would prefer rather than trying to stretch out and waste a lot of time and people's patience.
Stallone said he regrets making the film.

Music

Reception

Critical response
The film was panned upon its release, and is generally regarded as a commercial and critical flop. On Rotten Tomatoes, the film has an approval rating of 20% based on reviews from 15 critics. On Metacritic the film has a weighted average score of 36 out of 100, based on 9 critics, indicating "generally unfavorable reviews". Nonetheless, the soundtrack album gave Dolly Parton two top ten country singles: "Tennessee Homesick Blues" and "God Won't Get You".

Variety magazine wrote: "Effortlessly living up to its title, Rhinestone is as artificial and synthetic a concoction as has ever made its way to the screen."

Phil Alden Robinson publicly distanced himself from the film during its release, writing to critics for the purpose of complaining about changes made to his script.

Accolades

References

External links
 
 
 
 

1984 films
1984 romantic comedy films
1980s English-language films
1980s musical comedy films
20th Century Fox films
American musical comedy films
American romantic comedy films
Country music films
Films based on songs
Films directed by Bob Clark
Films set in New York City
Films set in Tennessee
Films shot in New York City
Films with screenplays by Sylvester Stallone
Golden Raspberry Award winning films
1980s American films